The Sacred Heart Cathedral is a religious building of the Catholic church that is located in South Tarawa on the atoll of Tarawa part of the island nation of Kiribati in Oceania.

History
Since 1966, the Sacred Heart Cathedral is the seat of the Bishop of the Diocese of Tarawa and Nauru (Dioecesis Taravana et Nauruna) which was created in 1982 to replace the Diocese of Tarawa and Nauru Funafuti of 1978 and Diocese of Tarawa of 1966.

It was under the pastoral responsibility of the Bishop-elected Koru Tito, and since the acting Vicar general Tatau.

See also
Roman Catholicism in Kiribati
Sacred Heart Cathedral (disambiguation)

References

Roman Catholic cathedrals in Kiribati
Tarawa